Turbinellina is a monotypic genus of South American sheet weavers containing the single species, Turbinellina nigra. It was first described by Norman I. Platnick in 1993, and is only found in Argentina and Chile.

See also
 List of Linyphiidae species (Q–Z)

References

Linyphiidae
Monotypic Araneomorphae genera
Spiders of South America